This is a list of rivers in Chad. This list is arranged by drainage basin, with respective tributaries indented under each larger stream's name.

Gulf of Guinea
Niger River (Nigeria)
Benue River (Nigeria)
Mayo Kébbi

Lake Chad

Chari River
Logone River
Pendé River
Mbéré River
Bahr Erguig
Bahr Salamat
Bahr Azoum
Ouadi Kadja
Ouham River
Nana Barya
Bahr Kéita
Ko River
Bragoto River
Bahr Aouk (Aoukalé)
Bahr el Ghazal

Lake Fitri
Batha River

Darfur
Wadi Howar

References

Prentice-Hall, Inc., American World Atlas 1985
 GEOnet Names Server

Chad
Rivers